The 2016 Vegas 16 Tournament was a single-elimination postseason men's basketball tournament won by Old Dominion. The tournament consisted of eight National Collegiate Athletic Association (NCAA) Division I teams that did not receive bids to the NCAA tournament or the NIT.

Old Dominion defeated Oakland 68–67 in the championship game.

Games were played at the Mandalay Bay Events Center in Paradise, Nevada. First round games were March 28, with the semifinals March 29 and the championship March 30. All games aired on CBS Sports Network.

Participants
The 8-team field for the inaugural Vegas 16 tournament was unveiled on March 14, 2016. While organizers had originally aimed to have a 16-team field, a decision was made to cut the size to 8 teams, stating that due to the results of conference tournaments, "we were hesitant to just fill out the bracket with 'available teams,' so by choosing quality over quantity, we settled on eight teams, many of which were considered for an NIT berth."

Schedule

Bracket

MVP and all-tournament team
Trey Freeman of Old Dominion was named the tournament most valuable player. The following players were named to the all-tournament team:
 Aaron Bacote, Old Dominion
 Kay Felder, Oakland
 Trey Freeman, Old Dominion
 Ge'Lawn Guyn, East Tennessee State
 Max Hooper, Oakland

References

External links
 Vegas 16 official website

Vegas 16
Vegas 16
Vegas 16